Seatrade is an Antwerp-based international transportation and shipping company specialised in the transport of perishables and other sensitive cargoes. Seatrade is the largest specialized refrigerated shipping company in the world, operating a fleet of near 100 specialised refrigerated vessels.

The company was founded in 1951.

References

External links
Official Seatrade website

Transport companies established in 1951
Shipping companies of Belgium
Belgian companies established in 1951